Skomielna Biała  is a large (~ 2750 inhabitants) village situated in southern Poland (Lesser Poland Voivodeship, Myślenice County, Lubień rural commune).

Villages in Myślenice County